VTV6 was a Vietnamese state-owned television network of Vietnam Television, which launched in 2007. It served the purpose of entertaining the sports in Vietnam.

Although VTV6 was operated by Ban Thanh thiếu niên (Youth Department), several programs produced by Ban Sản xuất các Chương trình Thể thao (Department of Sports Programs Production, VTV Sports) were mostly broadcast on this channel since 2015, so it was also known as a live broadcast of sports events of VTV, especially Vietnamese sports events or major big events.

VTV6 officially ceased to broadcast on October 10, 2022, making place for a national channel aimed at Mekong Delta Region audiences - VTV Cần Thơ.

History 

VTV6 was originally mentioned for the first time in the development plan of Vietnam Television in the period 2006 - 2010 with the original orientation to be a specialized channel for sports. It was launched in 2007. In 2008, VTV6 Youth Center was officially renamed as VTV6 Youth Department.

In the early days, the channel's coverage was very limited. The channel was tested on channel VCTV10 and then broadcast in analog on broadcast channel. It was not until April 29, 2009, that the channel was broadcast in the South, then officially broadcast nationwide on September 7, 2010. At the same time, VTV6 also improved the quality of content and increase the broadcast time from 12/24h daily (12:00-24:00 daily) to 18/24h daily (06:00-24:00 daily) from November 1, 2010.

From January 1, 2013, the channel increased broadcasting time to 24 hours a day. This is the sixth channel of VTV to broadcast 24/24h daily.

From September 7, 2013, VTV6 became the second channel of VTV to be broadcast in HD standard (after VTV3), and the first channel of VTV to broadcast in full HD standard (since January 2015).

On January 12, 2018, VTV separated the Children's Board from the Youth Department. VTV6 officially entered a new movement called "The Digital Generation 2018", deciding to aiming at the "digital generation" born between the year of 1985 and 2000. Since that time, television programs for children on VTV6 channel were officially transferred to educational channel VTV7.

On September 8, 2022, Deputy Prime Minister Phạm Bình Minh signed Decree No. 60/2022/ND-CP on the functions, tasks, powers and organizational structure of Vietnam Television. Accordingly, VTV has been restructured, in which the Youth Department - the management board of VTV6 will be dissolved. As a result, VTV6 will officially cease to broadcast on October 10, 2022 and is replaced by for a national channel aimed at Mekong Delta Region audiences - VTV Cần Thơ.

Bulletin
360 độ thể thao (Sports 360°, since 2015)
Nhịp đập thể thao (Sports Beat, broadcast along with VTV3, since 2021)
 VTV Sports News (since 2019 - 2020)

Others programmes on VTV6

Currently
Bản đồ ẩm thực Việt Nam (The Map of Vietnamese Cuisine)
 Bữa trưa vui vẻ (A Funny Lunchtime) (ended from March 31st, 2022)
 Cất cánh (The Risings)
 Chiến binh xanh (Green Fighters)
 Chuyến đi màu xanh (A Green Trip)
 Cuộc đua không dừng lại (Unstoppable Races)
 Ghế không tựa (The Stool)
 Hôm nay ai đến? (Who's Coming Today?)
 Khám phá thế giới (World Discovery)
 Quán thanh xuân (The Youngtime Cafe)

See also
CCTV5
RTM2
VTV Can Tho

References

Vietnam Television
2007 establishments in Vietnam
Television channels and stations established in 2007
2022 disestablishments in Vietnam
Television channels and stations disestablished in 2022
Television networks in Vietnam